Other effective area-based conservation measures (OECMs) are sites outside of protected areas that are governed and managed in ways that deliver the long-term in situ conservation of biodiversity. As of March 2023, 829 such sites have been reported to the World Database on Other Effective Area-based Conservation Measures, managed by the UN Environment Programme World Conservation Monitoring Centre.

Definition and criteria

An (OECM) is defined by the Convention on Biological Diversity as:

[A] geographically defined area other than a Protected Area, which is governed and managed in ways that achieve positive and sustained long-term outcomes for the in situ conservation of biodiversity, with associated ecosystem functions and services and where applicable, cultural, spiritual, socio–economic, and other locally relevant values.

There are four criteria for identifying OECMs:

The area is not currently recognized as a protected area; 
The area is governed and managed; 
The area achieves sustained and effective contribution to in situ conservation of biodiversity; Criterion 
Associated ecosystem functions and services and cultural, spiritual, socio-economic and other locally relevant values are conserved and respected.

Under the four criteria above, there are 26 sub-criteria.

History

The term "other effective area-based conservation measures" was first used in Target 11 of the Convention on Biological Diversity’s Strategic Plan for Biodiversity, agreed to in Nagoya, Japan, in 2010. Target 11 stated:

By 2020, at least 17 per cent of terrestrial and inland water areas and 10 per cent of coastal and marine areas, especially areas of particular importance for biodiversity and ecosystem services, are conserved through effectively and equitably managed, ecologically representative and well connected systems of protected areas and other effective area-based conservation measures, and integrated into the wider landscapes and seascapes. (Emphasis added)

In 2014, Harry Jonas, Ashish Kothari and other authors affiliated with the ICCA Consortium – ICCA stands for "Indigenous and Community Conserved Area" – argued that “defining ‘other effective area-based conservation measures’ offers a unique opportunity to better recognize areas that deliver the conservation of biodiversity outside of protected areas.” In 2015, the International Union for Conservation of Nature World Commission on Protected Areas established a Task Force, co-chaired by Harry Jonas and Kathy MacKinnon (2016-2020), to provide technical advice to the Convention on Biological Diversity. It submitted its advice to the Secretariat  of the Convention on Biological Diversity in January 2018. That advice, together with a report on marine OECMs, was considered at two workshops hosted by the Secretariat of the Convention on Biological Diversity in February 2018.

Parties to the Convention on Biological Diversity negotiated a draft decision at the 22nd meeting of the Subsidiary Body on Scientific, Technical and Technological Advice, and adopted Decision 14/8 on ‘Protected areas and other effective area-based conservation measures’ at the 14th meeting of the Conference of the Parties, which contains the definition and criteria for identifying OECMs.

‘Other effective area-based conservation measures’ are referenced in Target 3 of the draftGlobal Biodiversity Framework. The Framework was agreed upon in December 2022 at the 15th Conference of the Parties to the UN Convention on Biological Diversity in Montreal, Canada. Integration of OECMs into global biodiversity targets has been a topic of discussion in the lead-up to the conference. Target 3 calls for: 
"Ensure and enable that by 2030 at least 30 per cent of terrestrial, inland water, and of coastal and marine areas, especially areas of particular importance for biodiversity and ecosystem functions and services, are effectively conserved and managed through ecologically representative, well-connected and equitably governed systems of protected areas and other effective area-based conservation measures, recognizing indigenous and traditional territories, where applicable, and integrated into wider landscapes, seascapes and the ocean, while ensuring that any sustainable use, where appropriate in such areas, is fully consistent with conservation outcomes, recognizing and respecting the rights of indigenous peoples and local communities, including over their traditional territories."

Global extent

The World Database on Other Effective Area-based Conservation Measures is managed by the UN Environment Programme World Conservation Monitoring Centre. As of March 2023, 829 sites have been reported to the World Database.

Locally managed marine areas (LMMAs) are one form of OECM; examples of these exist in Mozambique and Madagascar.

Relationship between OECMs and protected areas

Protected areas and OECMs are distinct but complementary within landscapes, seascapes and river basins. Protected areas have a primary conservation objective, i.e., they are areas dedicated to the conservation of biodiversity and managed accordingly. In contrast, OECMs do not need to be dedicated to the conservation of nature but must deliver the effective and long-term in situ conservation of biodiversity. OECMs can deliver long-term in situ conservation through ancillary conservation, secondary conservation, and sometimes primary conservation in places that cannot, or will not, be recognized as protected areas.

OECMs are intended to take a more inclusive approach to biodiversity conservation that traditional protected areas, by permitting some small-scale area management. This is achieved by accounting for the needs of other rights holders such as small scale fisheries and low-impact agroforestry. Traditional protected areas have attracted controversy over Indigenous rights and displacement; OECMs are intended to be more equitable to human needs.

See also
Governance of protected areas
UNESCO Biosphere Reserve

References

External links
Convention on Biological Diversity homepage
ICCA Consortium homepage
International Union for Conservation of Nature homepage

Environmental conservation
Convention on Biological Diversity